Yüksekova is a municipality (belde) in the Yüksekova District of Hakkâri Province in Turkey and is the largest city in the whole province. The city is populated by Kurds of different tribal backgrounds including non-tribal and had a population of 72,745 in 2022.

The mayor is Remziye Yaşar since 2019.

Name 
Yüksekova was historically known as Dize meaning fortress in Kurdish.

The word Yüksekova means 'plateau' and is a Turkification of the original name Gever which in Kurdish means 'raised meadow'. In Armenian, however, the word refers to an administrative unit such as district of province, while the word refers to Zoroastrians in Persian. For Muslims, Gavar means infidel and refers to all non-Muslims.

Neighborhoods 
The city is divided into the ten neighborhoods of Cumhuriyet, Dize, Esentepe, Esenyurt, Eskikışla, Güngor, Ipek, Mezarlık, Yeni and Yeşildere.

Demographics 
Population history of the municipality from 2000 to 2022:

References 

Kurdish settlements in Hakkâri Province
Populated places in Hakkâri Province